City Montessori School, Kanpur Road Branch is a private school  that offers education up to the intermediate level, in Lucknow, India. It is a co-educational, English Medium institution affiliated to ICSE Board, New Delhi. The streams offered are Science, Commerce and Arts. The school has been ranked 6th in the "most respected secondary schools" in India list compiled by IMRB in 2007.School has strength of 8397students with Pre-Primary as 1120, Primary as 3398, Junior as 1941 and Senior 1938.

Organization 
CMS Kanpur Road comprises four sections:

The Pre-Primary Section
CMS has adopted the Montessori method of preschool education. The Pre-Primary section admits boys and girls between the ages of 2 and 5 as follows:
 Montessori: 2 to 3 years of age (Play Group)
 Nursery: 4 years of age
 Kindergarten: 5 to 6 years of age

The Primary Section
The Primary Section consist of Grades I-V.

The Junior Section
The Junior Section consists of Grades VI-VIII.

The Senior Section
The Senior Section consists of Grades IX-XII

Infrastructure
CMS Kanpur Road Branch consists of two four-storied buildings, with  a computer and television in each. All the class rooms are connected through a Wi-Fi system. The school has computer rooms, libraries, Physics, Chemistry, Biology and Bio-Technology labs; a play ground, a swimming pool and a basketball court. The branch has an auditorium named World Unity and Convention Center (WUCC)  which has a seating capacity of almost 4000 people. The school also has a 6 acred park namely the Jai Jagat park.

Practices

Morning prayer assembly
Students participate in the morning assembly, lasting about half an hour and consisting of the recital of devotional songs and prayers. A group of students conducts the assembly and presents virtue-talks and speeches and stories.

Class presentations 
Class presentations showcase individual talent. Each child takes part in a 2-2½ hour long ensemble of dances, songs, cultural presentations, skits, debates, etc.

Spoken English 
CMS Kanpur Road is an English Medium School and thus spoken English is stressed.

Enrichment classes 
With the aim of adapting the curriculum to individual needs the school runs enrichment classes. These are held after school hours and consist of small groups where discussion, problem-solving, reinforcement of learning and close teacher student interaction takes place.

Student Council
To develop leadership qualities and a sense of responsibility in children the school has a head boy/head girl, captains, vice captains and prefects who are responsible for discipline, neatness, and organization of functions.

Extracurricular activities 
Students participate in National and International competitions including International Robotics Olympiads, International Quality Circle Conventions, International Astronomy Olympiads, Environmental workshops, International Science festivals like Quanta, Macfair, Cofas, Celesta, SAARC Youth Festival, World Peace Festival, Children's International Summer Village (CISV) Camps, International School to School Exchange (ISSE) programmes, National Mathematics Olympiads, National Talent Search Examination and National Choral Singing Competitions.

Gallery

References

External links 
 Kanpur Road Campus
 City Montessori School, India, Lucknow
 Welcome to CMS Personality Development & Career Counselling
 Mass Participation - Largest school by pupils
 City Montessori School [CMS], Lucknow, India

Montessori schools in India
Primary schools in Uttar Pradesh
High schools and secondary schools in Uttar Pradesh
Private schools in Lucknow
Educational institutions established in 1993
1993 establishments in Uttar Pradesh